The Paakantyi, or Barkindji or Barkandji, are an Australian Aboriginal tribal group of the Darling River (known to them as the Baaka) basin in Far West New South Wales, Australia.

Name
The ethnonym Paakantyi means "River people", formed from paaka river and the suffix -ntyi, meaning "belonging to", thus "belonging to the river". They refer to themselves as wimpatjas. The name Paakantyi therefore simply means the River People.

Language
Traditionally they speak the Paakantyi language of the Pama–Nyungan family, and one of the three major Aboriginal languages for the people of present-day Broken Hill region.

The major work on the Paakantyi language has been that of the late linguist Luise Hercus.

Country

The Paakantyi dwelt along the Darling River, from Wilcannia downstream almost to Avoca. Inland from either side of the Darling, their territory extended to a distance of roughly 20–30 miles. They lived also in the back country from the river, around the Paroo River and Broken Hill. They were close neighbours of the Maraura, further down the Great Darling Anabranch.

The landscape is characterized by brick-red sandhills and grey clay flats.

The Barkindji today derive from several dialects, all speaking variations of the same language or Barlku. Historically these dialects were distinct groups, but with colonisation these groups are more singularly recognised as Barkindji today, with the language (Paakantyi palku) and intermarriage linking these smaller dialect groups together in far western NSW:
 Baarundji (Barrindji)
 Wilyakali (Wilyali)
 Pulakali (Pulaali)
 Pantjikali (Pantjaali)
 Wanyuparlku (Wanyuwalku) 
 Barkindji
 Thankakali (Dhangaali)
 Marawara (Maraura)

The land was harsh: drought was not rare. When parched conditions set in, the Paakantyi would withdraw into the backcountry around the few perennial springs, and cull the starving wildlife that came to slake themselves there.

Mythology
In Paakantyi lore, the landscape of and around the river was created by Ngatji, the dreamtime rainbow serpent  This figure is still believed to travel underground from waterhole to waterhole, and should not be disturbed. His presence is seen in such phenomena as when whirly breezes stir up the Darling's waterways.

History of contact

The first colonizer who travelled through their territory, Thomas Mitchell, appears to be referring to the Barkindji when he mentions the Occa tribe in the area of Wilcannia.

One estimate of the population for the period immediately before contact with whites, taking into account the hard climatic conditions, suggested that the  could have sustained no more than 100 people. On the other hand, Simpson Newland, a contemporary familiar with the district where they lived, wrote in illustration of the point that: "we cannot but admit that our happy prosperous lot in these bright colonies is purchased at the cost of the welfare, nay, even the lives of the possessors of the soil", and illustrated the point in the following words:
A few years ago the aboriginals of the Upper Darling were comparatively numerous; now they, in common with other tribes wherever the European has settled, have nearly passed away. This has been brought about by no epidemic, nor the use of intoxicants, or cold, or hunger; none of these have had much to do with it. I can vouch for their being well fed and clothed, and for years spirits were almost entirely kept from them; yet they died off, the old and young, the strong and weakly alike, sometimes with startling suddenness, at others by a wasting sickness of a few days, weeks, or months.
The people the explorer Mitchell encountered and called Occa, are, according to Norman Tindale, probably to be identified with the Paakantyi. Tindale argues that Mitchell misheard the name for their section of the river, Ba:ka.

Sometime around 1850, according to elders' memories, an epidemic attacked the Paakantyi and the neighbouring Naualko, affecting their numbers drastically tribes, killing off an estimated third of each tribe. Panic overtook the two peoples, they took flight, leaving those struck by the illness unburied in the sandhills - the mortality was particularly high around Peri Lake - as they sought refuge at the Paroo river, where the disease was unknown.

Frederic Bonney was one of the earliest settlers in their area, and ran stock there for 15 years.

In the nineteenth century, they were much reduced by disease and they ended up working for the immigrants who had invaded their lands. Pictures were taken by Bonney at Momba Station over 15 years from the mid-1860s down to 1880 which have provided a sympathetic and accurate picture of these people. Bonney wrote sympathetically of the Paakantyi, stating that they were "naturally honest, truthful, and kind-hearted. Their manner is remarkably courteous and to little children, they are very kind. Affectionate and faithful to chosen companions, also showing exceeding respect to aged persons and willingly attending to their wants."

With the disintegration of traditional tribal ways, the Paakantyi have been afflicted by alcoholism, high unemployment, and have a high incidence of inter-group and domestic violence.
The Paakantyi were considered to be a "vanishing tribe" by the mid-twentieth century. In recent times their descendants are concentrated in Wilcannia. At a conservative estimate of Wilcannia's approximately 600 residents, 68% are of Paakantyi descent. The town enjoyed a colonial boom, being the third largest inland port in those times, and was occasionally referred to, humorously and ironically, as "Queen City of the West", alluding to the nickname of the powerful river port in the US, Cincinnati. Overgrazing by cattle and sheep, the arrival of rabbits in the early 1890s and the Federation drought led to soil degradation and extensive loss of vegetation. Non-native species of fish introduced into the river system also damaged its ecology. In later periods the extraction of water for cotton farming higher up on the northern reaches of the Darling has drastically reduced water flow through this area for tribes once known as the "people of the river".

Native title
In 1997, the Barkindji people filed a lawsuit claiming the national native title tribunal. To support their claim they collected documents from traditional owners and reports written by anthropologists, historians and linguists.

Their native title was officially recognised by the Australian government, in a ruling handed down by federal judge Jayne Jagot, after 18 years of legal battle, in 2015.

Alternative names

 Bakanji, Bakandi,Bakanji, Bakandi, Bargunji, Bagundji, Bagandji
 Bandjangali
 Bargunji, Bagundji, Bagandji
 Barkinji, Barkinjee, Barkunjee, Bahkunji
 Bpaa'gkon-jee
 Kaiela (A Kureinji term for them, meaning "northerners")
 Kkengee
 Kornoo (A name for the language of several Darling River tribes)
 Kurnu
 Pakindji, Pa:kindzi, Bakandji, Bahkunjy, Barkinghi
 Parkungi, Parkengee, Parkingee, Parkingee
 Wimbaja ("man")

Source:

Some words
 kuuya (generic term for fish)
 mingga (waterhole)
 parntu (cod)

Source:

Notable people
 Elsie Rose Jones, elder and respected teacher (1917–1996)
 Annie Moysey, matriarch, known in later life as "Grannie Moysey" (1875-1976)
 Panga, artist, 1870s
 Dick Barkinji (explorer)
 Derek Eggmolesse-Smith, footballer
 Barkaa, musician

Some books
 Kilampa wura Kaani: The galah and the frill neck lizard, told by Elsie Jones, illustrated by Cecil Whyman. Wilcannia, N.S.W.: Disadvantaged Country Area Programme, 1978
 Paakantji Alphabet Book, by Elsie Jones, illustrated by Mark Quale and Tim Whyman. Dubbo: Disadvantaged Country Area Programme, Western Readers Committee, 1981.
 The Story of the Falling Star, told by Elsie Jones, with drawings by Doug Jones and collages by Karin Donaldson. Canberra: Aboriginal Studies Press, for the Australian Institute of Aboriginal Studies, 1989.

Notes

Citations

Sources

Aboriginal peoples of New South Wales
Far West (New South Wales)